Mary Ambree ( 1584) was an English army captain from Antwerp who participated in the liberation of the Belgian city Ghent during the war against Spain. While she has not been recorded extensively in history, she was featured in ballads and referenced in culture from the 1620s onwards. Notably, one ballad about Mary Ambree was one of the most popular ballads of the 17th century.

In 1584 the Spanish captured Ghent, and Captain Mary Ambree, along with several other Dutch and English volunteers, fought to liberate the city. It was said that she was avenging her lover, Sir John Major, a sergeant major who died during the siege.

English and Folklore professor Dianne Dugaw dates the story of Ambree based on a ballad about her being listed on 1590's song sheets. Dugaw claims that this would have originally been a "news song" that told the public current events.

Legacy 
She was a popular subject of ballads during the 17th-century from 1620s onwards. She was also referenced in many works and by various writers and other artists. Because of her notoriety, Mary Ambree became an "archetype of gender disguise."

 Ambree was the subject of the ballad "The valorous acts performed at Gunt by the brave bonnie lass Mary Ambree, who in revenge of her lovers death did play her part most gallantly. The tune is, The blinde beggar,  &c." preserved by Thomas Percy in the Pepys Collection.  
 This ballad provided the title for Rudyard Kipling's well-known novel, Captains Courageous.  
 The first lines of this ballad are quoted in The First Part of the Return from Parnassus from The Three Parnassus Plays
 A female French Legionnaire in the book Sowing Glory by P.C. Wren was referred to by the pseudonym of Mary Ambree in order to protect her identity.
 Ambree is mentioned in The Scornful Lady 
 Ambree may have been the "English Mall" Samuel Butler (poet) referenced in Hudibras
 Ben Jonson references Mary Ambree in Epicœne, or The Silent Woman and The Fortunate Isles
 Jonathan Swift references Ambree in A Tale of a Tub

References

External links
 Dianne Dugaw: Warrior Women and Popular Balladry, 1650-1850
 Reliques of Ancient English Poetry: Consisting of Old Heroic Ballads, Songs, and Other Pieces of Our Earlier Poets, Together with Some Few of Later Date, and a Copious Glossary
 English Historical Ballads. No. V – Mary Ambree: Siege of Cadiz

Place of birth unknown
Place of death unknown
Year of birth unknown
Year of death unknown
Women in 16th-century warfare
Women in the British military
16th-century English women
Women soldiers
16th-century English military personnel